Juan Nicolás Carrera Zarzar (born May 6, 2002) is a professional soccer player who plays as a defender for German  club FSV Zwickau on loan from Holstein Kiel. Born in Mexico, he represented the United States national under-17 team.

Club career
After a youth career that began with C.F. Pachuca and FC Dallas, Carrera made his pro club debut with North Texas SC in USL League One in 2019. In July 2020, he signed with Kiel and began his career in Germany on their team in the Under 19 Bundesliga.

On January 26, 2023, Carrera joined FSV Zwickau on loan.

International career
Carrera played for the Mexico national under-17 team before gaining American citizenship and joining the United States U17 roster for the 2019 FIFA U-17 World Cup.

References

External links
 
 Nico Carrera at FC Dallas
  at Holstein Kiel

2002 births
Living people
Mexican emigrants to the United States
Soccer players from Texas
American soccer players
Association football defenders
Mexican footballers
Mexico youth international footballers
United States men's youth international soccer players
Holstein Kiel players
Holstein Kiel II players
FSV Zwickau players
2. Bundesliga players
Regionalliga players
American expatriate soccer players
American expatriate soccer players in Germany